Jeffrey William Wilson  (born 24 October 1973) is a New Zealand sportsman who has represented his country in both rugby union and cricket – a so-called "Double All Black", an increasingly rare achievement in the professional era. He is also a basketballer, and won national secondary school titles in track and field. With 44 tries in 60 tests, Wilson is ranked thirteenth on the list of highest test try scorers in rugby. Wilson is married to Adine Wilson (née Harper), former captain of the New Zealand netball team.

Rugby career

Early career
Wilson attended Cargill High School, where in one rugby game against James Hargest College he scored nine tries and a total of 66 points in a game with a final score of 102–6. At the time tries were only worth 4 points  He played for the national secondary schools side against Australia in 1992.

All Blacks rugby
Wilson was first selected for the All Blacks tour to Britain in 1993, making his debut as an All Black against London and SE Division on 23 October 1993 and his test debut against Scotland on 20 November 1993, scoring three tries in that game.

He appeared 71 times for the All Blacks, including 60 tests and played in 1995 and 1999 Rugby World Cup, in the positions of wing and fullback. In Test matches he scored a total of 234 points: 44 tries, 1 conversion, 3 penalty goals, and 1 drop goal.

Wilson announced his retirement at the end of the 2000 Super 12 season, but made a comeback in 2001, playing another 6 Test matches before finally retiring in 2002 at the relatively young age of 28. Wilson stated he would have stayed on had John Hart continued to coach the All Blacks.

Up until 2002, he held the All Blacks try scoring record, with 44 tries from his 60 Test matches. This was later overtaken by fullback Christian Cullen and then Doug Howlett.

In the 2003 New Year Honours, Wilson was appointed a Member of the New Zealand Order of Merit, for services to rugby.

Domestic rugby
Wilson played Super 12 rugby for the Highlanders and NPC rugby for Otago and Southland. He made his Southland debut in 1992, his Otago debut in 1993 and his Highlanders debut in 1996, with whom he remained for his entire career. Wilson made 56 appearances for Otago and 72 for the Highlanders.

Cricket career
Wilson played his provincial cricket for Otago, as an all-rounder - both a hard-hitting batsman and a right-arm fast-medium pace bowler. His international appearances were in four games of a One Day Internationals (ODI) series against Australia in the 1992–93 season, and again in an ODI series in 2005. The arrival of the Super 12 rugby competition - which overlaps the cricket season by more than six weeks - forced him to decide early on which international career to pursue, truncating his cricket career.

On 22 February 2005, against Australia he played his first ODI match after nearly twelve years, which is a world record for the longest gap between two consecutive ODIs. Also he holds the record for the most consecutive ODI matches missed for a team by a player with 271 ODIS.

After his retirement from rugby, Wilson resumed playing cricket at the provincial level and then on 12 January 2005, was again selected for the Black Caps to play a series of one day matches against a World XI in January. Selected later in the season, his form fell away and his last ODI was played against Australia in Wellington on 1 March 2005. Wilson retired from cricket at the end of the 2005 season due to persistent injury.

Post-retirement 
After retirement Wilson spent the next few months breeding horses on a farm in Canterbury.  In May 2006 he accepted a position with the Otago Rugby Football Union to promote rugby within the Otago-Southland region in a development role. Rugby officials stated that "it's a brand new position, essentially it's going to be talent identification, a lot of mentoring and coaching one-on-one stuff." Wilson has since progressed to take on the role of Director of Rugby with the Otago Rugby Football Union, dealing with all aspects of the professional game. 

Wilson was the assistant coach of the North Harbour team in the ITM Cup between 2009 and 2012. In 2011 it was announced he would join the Auckland Blues as a skills coach for the 2012 season.

In 2013 he became a Sport Radio Breakfast Host with Ian Smith and Nathan Rarere on LiveSPORT Radios Breakfast of Champions.  On 7 September 2013, according to the live pregame commentary between All Blacks vs. Argentina, Jeff Wilson was signed by Sky Sports to commentate full-time for both rugby and cricket. Since then, Wilson has become a regular commentator for the channel.

References

External links

New Zealand Rugby Museum biography and career record
CricInfo article

1973 births
Living people
New Zealand international rugby union players
Members of the New Zealand Order of Merit
New Zealand rugby union players
Highlanders (rugby union) players
Southland rugby union players
Otago rugby union players
New Zealand cricketers
New Zealand Twenty20 International cricketers
New Zealand One Day International cricketers
New Zealand men's basketball players
Rugby union fullbacks
Rugby union wings
Cricketers from Invercargill
Otago cricketers
People educated at Aurora College (Invercargill)
Rugby union players from Invercargill